The Green Party of Kosovo (PGJK) was a green party in Kosovo. The party supported an environmentally clean Kosovo and its continual existence as an independent state.

History
The party was established in September 1991, when Kosovo was part of Yugoslavia. Its leader was Daut Maloku.

See also

Green party
Green politics
List of environmental organizations

References

External links


Political parties in Kosovo
Green parties in Europe
Political parties established in 1991
1991 establishments in Yugoslavia
Political parties in Yugoslavia